Omaliini is a tribe of ocellate rove beetles in the family Staphylinidae. There are about 12 genera and 19 described species in Omaliini.

Genera
These 12 genera belong to the tribe Omaliini:

 Acrolocha Thomson, 1858 g b
 Acruliopsis Zerche, 2003 b
 Carcinocephalus Bernhauer, 1904 g b
 Dropephylla Mulsant & Rey, 1880 g b
 Hapalaraea Thomson, 1858 g b
 Micralymma Westwood, 1838 g b
 Omalium Gravenhorst, 1802 c g b
 Phloeonomus Heer, 1839 g b
 Phloeostiba Thomson, 1858 c g b
 Phyllodrepa Thomson, 1859 g b
 Pycnoglypta Thomson, 1858 c g b
 Xylodromus Heer, 1839 c g b

Data sources: i = ITIS, c = Catalogue of Life, g = GBIF, b = Bugguide.net

References

Further reading

External links

 

Omaliinae